The 1957 Utah Redskins football team was an American football team that represented the University of Utah as a member of the Skyline Conference during the 1957 NCAA University Division football season. In their eighth and final season under head coach Jack Curtice, the Redskins compiled an overall record of 6–4 with a mark of 5–1 against conference opponents, winning the Skyline title. Home games were played on campus at Ute Stadium in Salt Lake City.

Curtice ran a wide-open offense. The Redskins  were led on the field by transfer quarterback Lee Grosscup, who finished tenth in the balloting for the Heisman Trophy as a junior and was a second-team AP and UPI All-American. Sophomore  Larry Wilson played safety and halfback and was later inducted into the Pro Football Hall of Fame after a career in the National Football League (NFL) with the St. Louis Cardinals.

After the season, Curtice left for Stanford University and was succeeded by Ray Nagel, the backfield coach at the University of California, Los Angeles (UCLA).

Schedule

Personnel
 QB Lee Grosscup, Jr.

After the season

NFL draft
Utah had three players selected in the 1958 NFL Draft.

References

Utah
Utah Utes football seasons
Mountain States Conference football champion seasons
Utah Redskins football